Abu Road railway station (station code: ABR) is located in Abu Road in the Indian state of Rajasthan . It serves Abu Road and is gateway to the popular hill station at Mount Abu.

The railway station

History
Rajputana State Railway opened the Delhi–Bandikui  -wide metre-gauge line in 1874, extended it to Ajmer in 1875 and to Ahmedabad in 1881. The Delhi–Ajmer metre-gauge line was converted to  broad gauge in 1994. The Ahmedabad–Ajmer sector was fully converted to broad gauge in 1997 – parts of it were converted earlier.

Services
 Ranakpur Express
 Suryanagri Express
 Dadar–Ajmer Superfast Express
 Mysore–Ajmer Express
 Bandra Terminus–Jodhpur Express
 Delhi Sarai Rohilla–Bandra Terminus Garib Rath Express
 Chandigarh–Bandra Terminus Superfast Express
 Bandra Terminus–Jammu Tawi Vivek Express
 Amrapur Aravali Express
 Bikaner–Dadar Superfast Express
 Gorakhpur Express
 Adi Gorakhpur Express via Ajmer/Jaipur
 Ahmedabad–Varanasi Weekly Express (via DLI, LKO & AJMER)
 Swarna Jayanti Rajdhani Express
 Ashram Express
 Haridwar Mail
 Jodhpur–Pune Express

Diesel Loco Shed 
The Diesel Loco Shed, Abu Road located here provides employment to a large number of people and holds an important place in town's economy. The Diesel Shed at Abu Road was commissioned by Indian Railways as a metre-gauge shed on 26 October 1966. It was then the largest MG shed of Western Railway with holdings of 112 locomotives. With broad gauge conversion, the shed was converted to a BG shed with holdings of 60 locomotives. There are 68 supervisors and 570 workers in the shed.. It is only Diesel shed in Ajmer division and 2nd in North Western Railway zone of the Indian Railways.

A diesel training center is located at the shed that conducts promotional, refresher and special courses for locomotive running staff as well as formal training of shed maintenance staff.

It is currently houses 140+ diesel locomotives like WDM 3A, WDG 3A, WDG 4, WDP 4D & WDG 4D.

References

External links
 Trains at Abu Road
 

Railway stations in Sirohi district
Ajmer railway division
1881 establishments in India
Railway stations in India opened in 1881
Abu Road